A coral island is a type of island formed from coral detritus and associated organic material. It occurs in tropical and sub-tropical areas, typically as part of a coral reef which has grown to cover a far larger area under the sea.

Ecosystem 

Coral reefs are some of the oldest ecosystems on the planet, over geological time forming massive reefs of limestone. The reef environment supports more plant and animal species than any other habitat. Coral reefs are vital for life for multiple aspects some of which include structure, ecology, and nutrient cycles which all support biodiversity in the reefs.

Coral reefs build massive calcareous skeletons that serve as homes for animals such as fish hiding inside the crooks and crannies of the reef and barnacles attaching themselves directly to the coral’s structure.  The structures also help plants that need the sun to photosynthesize, by lifting the plants to the ocean’s surface where the sunlight can penetrate the water. The structures also create calm zones in the ocean providing a place for fish and plant species to thrive.

Over geological time a reef may reach the surface and can become a coral island, where it begins a whole new ecosystem for land-based creatures.

Formation

A coral island begins as a volcanic island over a hot spot. As the volcano emerges from the sea, a fringing reef grows on the outskirt of the volcano. The volcano eventually moves off the hot spot by means of plate tectonics. Once this occurs, the volcano can no longer keep up with the wave erosion and undergoes subsidence.

Once the island is submerged, the coral must keep growing to stay in the epipelagic zone. This causes the coral to grow into an atoll with a shallow lagoon in the middle. The lagoon can then undergo accretion and create an island completely made of carbonate materials. The process is later enhanced with the remains of plant life which grows on the island.

Distribution
Most of the world's coral islands are in the Pacific Ocean. The American territories of Jarvis, Baker and Howland Islands are clear examples of coral islands. The Lakshadweep Islands union territory of India is a group of 39 coral Islands, along with some minor islets and banks. Some of the islands belonging to Kiribati are considered coral islands. The Maldives consist of coral islands. St. Martin's Island is an 8 km2 coral island located in Bangladesh. Coral islands are located near Pattaya and Ko Samui, Thailand.

Ecology 

Coral is important for biodiversity and the growth of fish populations, so maintaining coral reefs is important. Many coral islands are small with low elevation above sea level. Thus they are at threat from storms and rising sea levels. Through chemical and physical changes humans can cause significant harm to reef systems and slow the creation of coral island chains.

Coral reefs are threatened by numerous anthropogenic impacts, some of which have already had major effects worldwide. Reefs grow in shallow, warm, nutrient-poor waters where they are not outcompeted by phytoplankton. By adding fertilizers into the water runoff, phytoplankton populations can explode and choke out coral reef systems. Adding too many sediments can cause a similar problem by blocking out the sun, starving the zooxanthellae that live on coral causing it to undergo a process known as coral bleaching.

The ocean's acidity is also a factor. Coral is made of calcium carbonate and is dissolved by carbonic acid. With the increase in carbon dioxide from combustion reactions in the atmosphere through precipitation, carbon dioxide mixes with water and forms carbonic acid, raising the ocean's acidity which slows coral growth.

See also
 Raised coral atoll

References

Atolls
 
Islands by type